The Big Brake is a theoretical scientific model suggested as one of the possibilities for ultimate fate of the universe. In this model the effect of dark energy reverses, stopping the accelerating expansion of the Universe, and causing an infinite rate of deceleration. All cosmic matter would be subjected to extreme tidal forces and be destroyed.  Another possibility is matter may still exist, albeit in a different form and organization. The consequences for time are also unclear.

See also

 Big Bang
 Big Crunch
 Big Freeze
 Big Lurch (cosmology)
 Big Rip
 Big Whimper

References

Physical cosmology
Ultimate fate of the universe